During the crisis in Venezuela, governments of the United States, the European Union, Canada, Mexico, Panama and Switzerland applied individual sanctions against people associated with the administration of Nicolás Maduro. The sanctions were in response to repression during the 2014 Venezuelan protests and the 2017 Venezuelan protests, and activities during the 2017 Venezuelan Constituent Assembly election and the 2018 Venezuelan presidential election. Sanctions were placed on current and former government officials, including members of the Supreme Tribunal of Justice (TSJ) and the 2017 Constituent National Assembly (ANC), members of the military and security forces, and private individuals accused of being involved in human rights abuses, corruption, degradation in the rule of law and repression of democracy.

By March 2018, the Washington Office on Latin America said 78 Venezuelans associated with Maduro had been sanctioned by several countries. Through April 2019, the U.S. sanctioned more than 150 companies, vessels and individuals, in addition to revoking visas of 718 individuals associated with Maduro.

The sanctions included freezing of individuals' accounts and assets, prohibiting of transactions with sanctioned parties, seizing of assets, arms embargoes and travel bans. The OAS commissioner for Venezuelan migrants and refugees, David Smolansky, has said the sanctions targeted Maduro and Chavismo "elites" while having little impact on average Venezuelans. The Washington Post stated that "the deprivation long predates recently imposed US sanctions".

Beginning in January 2019, during the Venezuelan presidential crisis, the United States applied additional economic sanctions in the petroleum, gold, mining, food and banking industries. A report published by the United Nations High Commissioner for Human Rights stated that although the "pervasive and devastating economic and social crisis began before the imposition of the first economic sanctions", the new sanctions could worsen the situation. In April 2019, Human Rights Watch and Johns Hopkins Bloomberg School of Public Health published a joint report noting that most early sanctions did not target the Venezuelan economy in any way, adding that sanctions imposed in 2019 could worsen the situation, but that "the crisis precedes them".

After sanctions were issued, Venezuela has continued to ship oil and to send money to ally countries, shipping oil to Cuba and paying Saint Vincent and the Grenadines' debt with Petrocaribe in 2022.

United States 
Through April 2019, the U.S. has sanctioned more than 150 companies, vessels and individuals, in addition to revoking visas of 718 individuals associated with Maduro.

History and legislation 

The United States has been concerned about Venezuelan narcotics trafficking since 2005 and its lack of cooperation in combatting terrorism since 2006. The U.S. has used sanctions as a policy tool for at least a decade to combat terrorism-related activity as well as narcotics and human trafficking, corruption and human rights violations, according to the Congressional Research Service's "Venezuela: Overview of U.S. sanctions". In 2008, Executive Order 13224 (EO 13224) aimed to reduce terrorist funding in Venezuela via sanctions, and the United States Department of the Treasury has used the Foreign Narcotics Kingpin Designation Act (Kingpin Act) to sanction at least 22 Venezuelans, including several current and former government officials.

Prior to the crisis in Venezuela, in 2010 the Office of Foreign Assets Control (OFAC) sanctioned three current or former Venezuelan government officials, saying there was evidence they had materially helped the Revolutionary Armed Forces of Colombia (FARC) in the illegal drug trade. The order "freezes any assets the designated entities and individuals may have under U.S. jurisdiction and prohibits U.S. persons from conducting financial or commercial transactions involving those assets". Hugo Carvajal, former director of Venezuela's military intelligence (DGIM); Henry Rangel Silva, director National Directorate of Intelligence and Prevention Services (DISIP); and Ramón Rodríguez Chacín, former Minister of the Interior, were sanctioned. Carvajal was arrested in Spain on 12 April 2019 based on arrest warrant from the United States for the 2011 charges; the U.S. asked Spain to extradite Carvajal.

In 2011, four allies of Hugo Chávez, including a general, two politicians, and an intelligence official, were sanctioned for allegedly helping FARC obtain weapons and smuggle drugs. Then-Foreign Minister Maduro said the accusations were "abusive". Freddy Bernal, one of the sanctioned, dismissed the charges as "an aggression", saying he would not be frightened by the sanctions.

President Barack Obama signed the Venezuela Defense of Human Rights and Civil Society Act of 2014, a U.S. Act imposing sanctions on Venezuelan individuals held responsible by the United States for human rights violations during the 2014 Venezuelan protests, in December of that year. It "requires the President to impose sanctions" on those "responsible for significant acts of violence or serious human rights abuses associated with February 2014 protests or, more broadly, against anyone who has directed or ordered the arrest or prosecution of a person primarily because of the person's legitimate exercise of freedom of expression or assembly". The Act was extended in 2016 to expire on 31 December 2019.

On 2 February 2015, the United States Department of State imposed visa restrictions on current and former Venezuelan officials that were allegedly linked to presumed human rights abuses and political corruption. The visa restrictions also included family members, with the Department of State saying, "We are sending a clear message that human rights abusers, those who profit from public corruption, and their families are not welcome in the United States".

Obama issued Executive Order 13692 in March 2015, which blocks assets or imposes travel bans on those "involved in or responsible for the erosion of human rights guarantees, persecution of political opponents, curtailment of press freedoms, use of violence and human rights violations and abuses in response to antigovernment protests, and arbitrary arrest and detention of antigovernment protestors, as well as significant public corruption by senior government officials in the country."

United States National Security Advisor John R. Bolton outlined the policies of the administration of United States President Donald Trump towards Venezuela in a November 2018 speech, describing Venezuela as part of a troika of tyranny, along with Cuba and Nicaragua. Bolton has alternately described the three countries as the "triangle of terror" and the "three stooges of socialism", stating that the three are "the cause of immense human suffering, the impetus of enormous regional instability, and the genesis of a sordid cradle of communism in the western hemisphere". The United States has condemned actions of the governments of the three Latin American nations and has maintained both broad and targeted sanctions against their leadership.

Into 2020, President Donald Trump expressed that he believed that the removal of Maduro from office was occurring too slowly and that incremental processes, such as sanctions, did not provide results. Because such processes to remove Maduro were unsuccessful, President Trump began to consider military options, including a naval blockade against Venezuela.

Under EO 13692, the Obama administration sanctioned seven individuals, and the Trump administration has sanctioned 73 as of 8 March 2019.

On individuals

2015 

U.S. President Barack Obama issued a presidential order on 9 March 2015 declaring Venezuela a "threat to its national security" and ordered the United States Department of the Treasury to freeze property and assets of seven Venezuelan officials. The U.S. held the seven individuals sanctioned responsible for "excesses committed in the repression of the demonstrations of February 2014 that left at least 43 dead" including "erosion of human rights guarantees, persecution of political opponents, restrictions on press freedom, violence and human rights abuses in response to anti-government protests, arbitrary arrests and arrests of anti-government protesters, and significant public corruption". Among those sanctioned were Antonio Benavides Torres, commander in the Venezuelan armed forces and former leader of the Venezuelan National Guard, and SEBIN directors Manuel Bernal Martínez and Gustavo González López.

2017 
Tareck El Aissami, Vice President of Economy and Minister for National Industry and Production, and his frontman Samark Lopez Bello were named in February under the Kingpin Act as significant international narcotics traffickers. Five U.S. companies in Florida and an airplane registered in the U.S. were also blocked.

The U.S. Treasury Department sanctioned Maikel Moreno and seven members of the Venezuelan Supreme Justice Tribunal (TSJ) in May for usurping the functions of the Venezuelan National Assembly and permitting Maduro to govern by decree. The U.S. assets of the eight individuals were frozen, and U.S. persons prohibited from doing business with them.

In July, thirteen senior officials of the Venezuelan government associated with the 2017 Venezuelan Constituent Assembly elections were sanctioned for their role in undermining democracy and human rights. Those sanctioned included Elías Jaua, Presidential Commission for the ANC and Minister of Education; Tibisay Lucena, President of the Maduro-controlled National Electoral Council (CNE); Néstor Reverol, Minister of Interior and former Commander General of Venezuelan National Guard (GNB), indicted in 2016 by U.S. for drug conspiracy; Tarek William Saab, Ombudsman and President of Moral Council; and Iris Varela ANC member and Prisons Minister.

The United States Department of State condemned the Venezuelan Constituent Assembly election and refused to recognize the ANC, stating "We will continue to take strong and swift actions against the architects of authoritarianism in Venezuela, including those who participate in the National Constituent Assembly". The day after the election, the US sanctioned Nicolás Maduro, freezing his assets, banning United States citizens from dealing with Maduro and barring him from entering the United States, stating "These sanctions come a day after the Maduro government held elections for a National Constituent Assembly that aspires illegitimately to usurp the constitutional role of the democratically elected National Assembly, rewrite the constitution, and impose an authoritarian regime on the people of Venezuela". Maduro became the fourth head of state to be sanctioned by the United States government after Bashar al-Assad of Syria, Kim Jong-un of North Korea and Robert Mugabe of Zimbabwe. Maduro fired back at the sanctions during his victory speech saying "I don't obey imperial orders. I'm against the Ku Klux Klan that governs the White House, and I'm proud to feel that way."

The U.S. Treasury Department sanctioned eight officials associated with the 2017 Constituent National Assembly (ANC) in August, for participating in "anti-democratic actions pursuant to Executive Order 13692" by facilitating the "illegitimate Constituent Assembly to further entrench [Maduro's] dictatorship". The individuals sanctioned included Francisco Ameliach and Adán Chávez, the brother of Hugo Chávez.

In November, ten more government officials were added to OFAC's list of Venezuelans sanctioned after the regional elections; the U.S. Treasury Department described the individuals as being "associated with undermining electoral processes, media censorship, or corruption in government-administered food programs in Venezuela". Among those sanctioned was Minister Freddy Bernal, who heads the Local Committees for Supply and Production (CLAP) program, and was previously named in 2011 as a drug trafficker under the Kingpin Act for aiding the Revolutionary Armed Forces of Colombia (FARC).

2018 

The U.S. Treasury Department said on 5 January that corruption and repression continued in Venezuela and four senior military officers were sanctioned. Reuters reported that "Maduro regularly laughs off Washington's disapproval and blames the U.S. 'empire' for Venezuela's economic woes." Four more current or former officials were added to the sanctioned list in March 2018.

Just before the May 2018 Venezuelan presidential election, the U.S. Treasury Department sanctioned four Venezuelans and three companies it said were involved in corruption and money laundering. Individuals sanctioned included Diosdado Cabello, Chavismo's number two person and President of the ANC, his wife, Marleny Contreras Hernández de Cabello, who is also the Tourism Minister, and his brother José David Cabello Rondón, the president of Venezuela's tax authority, SENIAT. The three Florida companies, owned or controlled by sanctioned front man Rafael Sarria in Florida were: SAI Advisors Inc., Noor Plantation Investments LLC, and 11420 Corp. Fourteen other properties owned or controlled by Sarria in Florida and New York were also sanctioned. The U.S. Treasury Department said that, "Beyond extorting profits from Venezuela’s Customs and Tax Administration, in September 2017, the Cabello brothers, acting in their capacity as high-level Venezuelan government officials, approved a money laundering scheme based on illicit financial activities targeting the Venezuelan state-owned oil company Petroleos de Venezuela, S.A. (PDVSA)."

The U.S. Treasury Department seized a private jet and imposed sanctions on Maduro's inner circle in September. Maduro's wife, Cilia Flores, Defense Minister Vladimir Padrino López, Vice President Delcy Rodríguez, and her brother Jorge Rodríguez, Venezuela's Minister of Communications, were sanctioned. Agencia Vehiculos Especiales Rurales y Urbanos, C.A. (AVERUCA, C.A.), Quiana Trading Limited (Quiana Trading), and Panazeate SL were also sanctioned, as companies owned or controlled in the U.S., British Virgin Islands, and Spain by sanctioned parties. Maduro responded to his wife's sanctions, saying "You don’t mess with Cilia. You don’t mess with family. Don’t be cowards! Her only crime [is] being my wife."

2019 
The U.S. Treasury Department sanctioned seven individuals on 8 January 2019, who they said were benefitting from a corrupt currency exchange scheme. Alejandro Jose Andrade Cedeño, a former national Treasurer, "was sentenced by the United States District Court for the Southern District of Florida on November 27, 2018, to 10 years in prison for accepting over $1 billion in bribes for his role" in the scheme. OFAC also sanctioned five other individuals and 23 companies, including Venezuelan private TV network Globovisión and other companies owned or controlled by Raúl Gorrín and Gustavo Perdomo.

On 15 February 2019, officials of Maduro's security and intelligence were sanctioned for helping suppress democracy; the head of state-run PDVSA was also sanctioned. The U.S. Treasury Department says the security officials are responsible for torture, human rights abuses, and extrajudicial killings.

thumb|left|upright=0.9|Tarek Saab, Attorney General, sanctioned by Canada, the European Union, Mexico, Panama, Switzerland, U.S., and banned from entering Colombia
During the February 2019 shipping of humanitarian aid to Venezuela, U.S. Vice-president Mike Pence announced new US sanctions against four Venezuelan state governors, who the US says had furthered the humanitarian crisis by participating in the blocking of aid; the governors of the United Socialist Party representing Zulia, Apure, Vargas and Carabobo states were blacklisted. On 1 March, the U.S. Treasury Department sanctioned six more military and security forces individuals, including members of FAES, Fuerzas de Acciones Especiales, a special police force. The U.S. said these individuals helped obstruct the delivery of humanitarian aid to Venezuela on the Colombian and Brazilian borders.

On 11 March 2019, the US sanctioned a Russian bank Evrofinance Mosnarbank, which is jointly owned by Russian and Venezuelan state-owned companies. The U.S. Treasury Department accused the Moscow-based bank of being an economic lifeline for the "illegitimate Maduro regime."

The US sanctioned Minerven, Venezuela's state-run mining company, and its president, Adrian Antonio Perdomo in March 2019. The sanctions prohibit business with Minerven and Perdomo, and freeze their assets in the US. The U.S. Treasury department said that the Venezuelan military grants access to criminal organizations in exchange for money.

The U.S. Treasury sanctioned two companies on 5 April 2019 that had shipped Venezuelan oil to Cuba; the US says Cuban personnel and advisors help the Maduro government maintain power. U.S. citizens and businesses are prohibited from engaging in business with the companies, identified as Liberia-based Ballito Bay Shipping Inc., the owner of the Despina Andrianna, and the Greek company ProPer Management Inc., the operator of the vessel that was used for an oil shipment to Cuba. Another 34 ships that are owned by PDVSA were also added to the sanction list. The U.S. sanctioned nine ships and four more shipping companies on 12 April 2019: Liberian companies Jennifer Navigation Ltd., Large Range Ltd. and Lima Shipping Corp.; and Italian PB Tankers. An unnamed U.S. senior official told Bloomberg that these companies and vessels account for as much as half of the 50,000 barrels daily of oil that "Venezuela sends to Cuba in exchange for the social, intelligence and strategic support Havana provides Maduro". Cuba denies any influence on Venezuela's military and—along with Russia, China, Turkey and Iran—is determined to defend Maduro according to Bloomberg.

On 17 April 2019, the U.S. Treasury added sanctions to the Central Bank of Venezuela and one of its directors, Iliana Ruzza. Directors Simon Alejandro Zerpa Delgado and William Antonio Contreras were already sanctioned. In a speech on 17 April 2019 in Miami which marked the anniversary of the failed 1961 Bay of Pigs Invasion, Bolton announced new restrictions on U.S. dealings with the three countries he called the "troika of tyranny" — Cuba, Nicaragua and Venezuela — as "part of a broader set of policies" aimed at "reversing the Obama administration's embrace" of Cuba. Bolton said the sanction was "aimed at restricting U.S. transactions with the bank and cutting off the bank's access to U.S. currency", and "meant to be a warning to others, including Russia, against deploying military assets to Venezuela." United States Secretary of the Treasury Steven Mnuchin stated that the sanction was to prevent the Central Bank "from being used as a tool of the illegitimate Maduro regime, which continues to plunder Venezuelan assets and exploit government institutions to enrich corrupt insiders." Maduro responded in a television broadcast, saying: "Let me tell you, imperialist Mr. John Bolton—advisor to Donald Trump—that your sanctions give us more strength." Maduro said the sanctions were "totally illegal" and that "Central banks around the world are sacred, all countries respect them. ... To me the empire looks crazy, desperate."

On 26 April 2019, the U.S. Treasury sanctioned Maduro's foreign minister Jorge Arreaza and Judge Carol Padilla, which it accused of exploiting the U.S. financial system to support the "illegitimate" government of Nicolas Maduro. The U.S. Department of State issued a statement describing Arreaza as being "at the forefront" of the Maduro administration attempts "to thwart the democratic aspirations of the Venezuelan people", and Padilla as the judge involved in the detention of Roberto Marrero, Guaidó's top aide.

Following the Venezuelan uprising on 30 April 2019, the U.S. removed sanctions against former SEBIN chief Manuel Cristopher Figuera, who broke ranks with Maduro. The U.S. Treasury Department press release said the action demonstrated that "removal of sanctions may be available for designated persons who take concrete and meaningful actions to restore democratic order, refuse to take part in human rights abuses, speak out against abuses committed by the illegitimate Maduro regime, or combat corruption in Venezuela". In response to the arrest of National Assembly members, the US Treasury sanctioned on 10 May two shipping companies, and two ships, that transported oil from Venezuela to Cuba between late 2018 and March 2019. Both ships sanctioned have Panama flags: the tanker Ocean Elegance is owned by Monsoon Navigation Corporation, and Leon Dias by Serenity Martitime Limited. Mnuchin stated: "The U.S. will take further action if Cuba continues to receive Venezuelan oil in exchange for military support." The sanctions were a "direct response to SEBIN’s illegal arrest of National Assembly members".

On 27 June 2019, the United States sanctioned two former Venezuelan government officials Luis Alfredo Motta Domínguez and Eustiquio Jose Lugo Gomez, who, it claimed, were engaging in significant corruption and fraud to the detriment of the people of Venezuela. The Miami US attorney's office said during a news release that the Motta is indicted on seven counts of money laundering and one count of money laundering conspiracy, after awarding US$60 million in contracts to three Florida-based companies in return for bribes. In April, President Maduro dismissed Motta as Electricity Minister after a series of blackouts occurred in March.

On 28 June 2019, the United States placed sanctions on President Maduro's son, Nicolas Maduro Guerra for being a current or former official of the Government of Venezuela, as well as being a member of Venezuela's Constituent Assembly. The U.S. Treasury Department accuses Maduro Guerra of maintaining a stranglehold on the economy and suppressing the people of Venezuela.

Following the death of Venezuelan navy captain Rafael Acosta Arévalo on 29 June, the United States sanctioned Dirección General de Contrainteligencia Militar on 11 July 2019, accusing the defense agency of being responsible for his death.

On 19 July 2019, US Vice President Mike Pence announced new sanctions on DGCIM officials who, he said, were responsible for repressing and torturing Venezuelans. Pence said the UN had reported that there were nearly 7000 "killings by [the] Maduro regime in the last 18 months".

On 25 July 2019, US Special Representative for Venezuela Elliott Abrams announced that the government was considering imposing new sanctions on Russia over its support for President Maduro. Abrams said "On Russia, we are still thinking about what sanctions to apply, individual or sectorial. They are not giving any more money to Venezuela. They are taking their money out."

On 7 October 2019, Adobe Inc. announced that it decided to stop providing cloud services in Venezuela to comply with the executive orders. All last versions of Adobe products use cloud. It gave users time until 28 October to download their files from clouds. However, on 28 October Adobe announced that it would continue providing cloud services.

2020 

The United States Department of the Treasury sanctioned seven individuals, for their involvement in the disputed internal parliamentary elections of the National Assembly in January 2020. The election was disrupted and resulted in two competing claims for the Presidency of the National Assembly: one by legislator Luis Parra, later supported by Nicolás Maduro, and one by the incumbent Juan Guaidó. According to US Secretary of Treasury Steven Mnuchin on 13 January 2020, the US blacklisted the Venezuelan lawmakers "who, at the bidding of Maduro, attempted to block the democratic process in Venezuela." The sanctioned had their assets in the US frozen and are not allowed to do business with US financial markets nor with US citizens. The list includes the members of Luis Parra's appointed board of directors and his supporters: Franklyn Duarte, José Goyo Noriega, José Brito, Adolfo Superlano and Parra himself.

On 7 February 2020, OFAC added state airline Conviasa and its fleet of 40 aircraft (including presidential aircraft) to the Specially Designated Nationals ("SDN") list. In practice, this makes it extremely unlikely that Conviasa will be able to source replacement parts for its fleet of airworthy and grounded Boeing B737 aircraft. Additionally, US citizens and companies are prohibited from flying on Conviasa's domestic and international flights. Finally, to the extent that other countries abide by OFAC policy, those countries (Brazil, France and the United Kingdom) will refuse to sell Conviasa replacement parts for Embraer and Airbus aircraft, prohibit its nationals from flying Conviasa, and will cancel Conviasa-serviced routes to their respective countries (Panama, Mexico, Bolivia, and Ecuador).

On 18 February 2020, the Office of Foreign Assets Control ("OFAC") sanctioned Rosneft, its Swiss-incorporated company (Rosneft Trading S.A.) and its president and chairman of board of directors Didier Casimiro on 18 February 2020 for supporting Venezuela's Nicolás Maduro government by operating in the oil sector of the Venezuelan economy. The company was previously sanctioned by the Obama administration on 16 July 2014 in retaliation for the ongoing Ukrainian crisis, annexation of the Crimean Peninsula by the Kremlin, and the Russian interference in Ukraine.

Into 2020, President Donald Trump expressed that he believed that the removal of Maduro from office was occurring too slowly and that incremental processes such as sanctions did not provide results. Because such processes to remove Maduro were unsuccessful, President Trump began to consider military options, including a naval blockade against Venezuela.

On 26 March 2020, the U.S. Department of State offered $15 million on Nicolás Maduro, and $10 million each on Diosdado Cabello, Hugo Carvajal, Clíver Alcalá Cordones and Tareck El Aissami, for information to bring those individuals to justice in relation to drug trafficking and narco-terrorism.

Embargo 

In August 2019, President Donald Trump imposed additional sanctions on Venezuela, ordering a freeze on all Venezuelan government assets in the United States and barred transactions with US citizens and companies. The United Nations High Commissioner for Human Rights, Michelle Bachelet raised concern about these US sanctions against President Nicolás Maduro. The UN rights chief condemned the measures as "extremely broad" that are capable of exacerbating the suffering of the Venezuelan people. Following the decision, National Security Advisor John R. Bolton said that his government was ready to impose sanctions on any international company doing business with Nicolás Maduro, an act that could ensnare its dealings with its allies such as Russia, China and Turkey as well as Western companies.

On industries 
Trump issued EO 13850 on 1 November 2018 to block the assets of anyone involved in corruption in the gold sector, or "any other sector of the economy as determined in the future by the Secretary of the Treasury". U.S. Treasury Secretary Mnuchin determined on 28 January 2019 that EO 13850 applied to the petroleum sector.

Three additional Executive Orders have been applied in the areas of Venezuelan sanctions. EO 13808, issued on 27 July 2017, prohibits the Venezuelan government from accessing U.S. financial markets, allowing for "exceptions to minimize the impact on the Venezuelan people and U.S. economic interests. The sanctions restrict the Venezuelan government's access to U.S. debt and equity markets." This includes the state-run oil company, PDVSA. Issued in 2018, EO 13827 prohibits the use of Venezuelan digital currency, and EO 13835 prohibits the purchase of Venezuelan debt.

The Organization of American States (OAS) commissioner for Venezuelan migrants and refugees, David Smolansky in Public Radio International said that US sanctions "target President Nicolás Maduro and his circle of elite government officials in an attempt to control their access to financial assistance from US citizens and companies". The authors add that while "Chavismo elites were hit with a variety of sanctions over the last three years, they've done little to make an impact on ordinary Venezuelans, whose lives have spiraled into a humanitarian crisis as hyperinflation has driven nearly 3 million to flee." As the humanitarian crisis deepened and expanded, the Trump administration levied more serious economic sanctions against Venezuela on 28 January, and "Maduro accused the US of plunging Venezuelan citizens further into economic crisis." Rafael Uzcátegui, director of PROVEA, added that "sanctions against PDVSA are likely to yield stronger and more direct economic consequences, and that "[w]e should remember that 70 to 80 percent of Venezuela's food is imported, and there's barely any medicine production in the country."

Petroleum 

In August 2017, Trump imposed economic sanctions that moderately affected Venezuela's petroleum industry, according to the New York Times, by prohibiting the trading of Venezuelan bonds in U.S. markets. The New York Times said there were "broad loopholes, allowing for the financing of most commercial trade, including the export of American light crude oil to Venezuela for mixing with its heavy crude, and financing for humanitarian services to the Venezuelan people", and quoted analysts who said the sanctions would not be a "lethal blow", rather would "send a message". The White House saw the limited measures as a way to "protect the United States financial system from complicity in Venezuela's corruption and in the impoverishment of the Venezuelan people, and allow for humanitarian assistance". According to the U.S. State Department, this "closes another avenue for corruption by denying the Venezuelan regime the ability to earn money by selling off public assets at 'fire sale' prices at the expense of the Venezuelan people".

On 28 January, the United States imposed sanctions on the Venezuelan state-owned oil and natural gas company PDVSA to pressure Maduro to resign during the 2019 Venezuelan presidential crisis. The sanctions prevent PDVSA from being paid for petroleum exports to the US, freeze $7 billion of PDVSA's US assets and prevent US firms from exporting naphtha to Venezuela. Bolton estimated the expected loss to the Venezuelan economy at more than $11 billion in 2019. Reuters said the sanctions are expected to reduce Venezuela's ability to purchase food and other imports which could result in further shortages and worsen its economic position.

In February, Maduro ordered PDVSA to move its European office to Moscow to protect PDVSA's overseas assets from US sanctions. The Russian state-run oil company Rosneft has supplied naphtha to Venezuela and continues to purchase Venezuelan petroleum which it says is through contracts that were in place prior to the US sanctions. Exports of Venezuela's heavy crude oil depend on diluents that were imported from the US before sanctions; Rosneft chartered a ship to load thinners from Malta and deliver them to Venezuela on 22 March, and it has arranged for shipping of Venezuelan crude oil to be processed in India. Other companies including India's Reliance Industries Limited, Spain's Repsol, and commodity trading companies Trafigura and Vitol continued to supply Venezuela's oil industry as of 11 April 2019. On 17 April, Reuters reported that Repsol was in discussion with the Trump administration and had suspended its swaps with PDVSA.

The Venezuelan National Assembly has been looking at ways to access Venezuela's overseas cash and facilities. PDVSA's US subsidiary Citgo announced in February that it would formally cut ties with PDVSA to comply with US sanctions on Venezuela, and halted payments to PDVSA. Juan Guaidó and the National Assembly appointed a new Citgo board of directors under Chairperson Luisa Palacios. The National Assembly authorized Guaidó's appointment of a new ad hoc board of PDVSA, Citgo, Pdvsa Holding Inc, Citgo Holding Inc. and Citgo Petroleum Corporation. Even though control of PDVSA assets in Venezuela remained with Maduro, Guaidó also named a new board for PDVSA. With Citgo under the control of Guaidó's administration, the US Department of Treasury extended its license to operate in spite of US sanctions.

Stating it was a "sign of the growing dependence of Venezuela’s cash-strapped government on Russia", Reuters reported on 18 April 2019 that the Maduro administration was bypassing the sanctions by funneling cash from petroleum sales through Russia's Rosneft. Reliance denied reports that it was in violation of U.S. sanctions and stated that its purchases of Venezuelan oil through Rosneft had the approval of the U.S. State Department.

April oil exports were steady at a million barrels daily, "partially due to inventory drains", with most shipments to buyers from India and China. Production in April was eight percent higher than it was in March, during the 2019 Venezuelan blackouts. Even with sanctions, shipments to Cuba were unchanged.

Petrocaribe

Through Petrocaribe, Caribbean countries including Haiti and Jamaica had been able to finance 40% of their Venezuelan crude oil purchases over 25 years at 1% interest; Cuba received free oil in exchange for medical services. Reuters said, "The Caribbean region has long relied on oil and gas from Venezuela, which offered cheap financing through a program called Petrocaribe, though shipments have declined in recent years because of production problems at Venezuela’s state-owned oil company PDVSA." Research by the journalism group Connectas said that Venezuela had spent $28 billion worth of oil to buy support from 14 Caribbean countries; according to the Connectas study the social benefits that were intended for the countries of Petrocaribe were not realized, which they say was ignored by the Venezuelan government because Petrocaribe countries were intended to protect Venezuela's sovereignty in international organizations like the UN and OAS.

Several leaders of Caribbean countries supporting Maduro criticized the US sanctions, saying their support for Maduro was based on principles, not oil, and that sanctions were affecting their countries' supply, debt payments, and the region's stability. The director of the Latin America and Caribbean Energy Program at the University of Texas at Austin, Jorge Piñón, said the supply cuts to these Caribbean countries were not due to the sanctions, but the mismanagement of PDVSA. When Chávez was elected, Venezuela was producing 3.5 million barrels per day of crude oil; as of March 2019, production is about 1 million barrels per day, and Piñón says these countries should have seen the problems coming. Gaston Browne, Prime Minister of Antigua and Barbuda, and others criticized the US intent in the region, saying that "Washington should provide more aid to these nations and not spend billions on useless wars". With the Venezuelan crisis dividing Caribbean countries, those countries that did not recognize Maduro were invited to meet with Trump in March 2019. Following the meeting, Trump promised more investment to the countries supporting Guaidó (Bahamas, Dominican Republic, Haiti, Jamaica and Saint Lucia), although "the White House did not specifically tie the carrot of investment to that support".

Gold mining 
Venezuela's third-largest export (after crude oil and refined petroleum products) is gold. The country's gold production is controlled by the military and is mined under dangerous conditions. The World Gold Council reported in January 2019 that Venezuela's foreign-held gold reserves had fallen by 69% to US$8.4 billion during Maduro's presidency, but that it was hard to track where the gold was going. Central Bank gold holdings decreased in November 2018 from US$6.1 billion to US$5.5 billion; the last independent observer to access the vault where gold is stored was Francisco Rodríguez, who saw an estimated US$15 billion in 2014. Reuters reported that 20 tons were removed from the vaults in 2018, and 23 tons of mined gold were taken to Istanbul, Turkey. In the first nine months of 2018, Venezuela's gold exports to Turkey rose from zero in the previous year to US$900 million.

On 1 November 2018 Trump signed an executive order to "ban U.S. persons from dealing with entities and individuals involved with 'corrupt or deceptive' gold sales from Venezuela".

In mid-February 2019, a National Assembly legislator Angel Alvarado said that about eight tons of gold had been taken from the vault while the head of the Central Bank was abroad. In March, Ugandan investigators were looking into recent gold imports, and reported that 7.4 tonnes of gold worth over US$300 million could have been smuggled into that country.

The U.S. Treasury Department sanctioned Minerven, Venezuela's state-run mining company, and its president, Adrian Antonio Perdomo in March 2019. The sanctions prohibit business with Minerven and Perdomo, and freeze their assets in the US. The Treasury department said that the Venezuelan military grants access to criminal organizations in exchange for money.

Government sources said another eight tonnes of gold was taken out of the Central Bank in the first week of April 2019; the government source said that there were 100 tonnes left. The gold was removed while the bank was not fully operational because of the ongoing, widespread power outages and minimal staff was present; the destination of the gold was not known.

According to Bloomberg, the Central Bank sold 9.5 tonnes of gold on 10 May and three more tonnes some days later.

In an exclusive report in March 2020, Reuters estimated that there were about 90 tonnes of gold left in the country, compared to 129 tonnes at the start of 2019.

Banking and finance 
On 19 March 2018, U.S. President Donald Trump signed an order that prohibits people in the U.S. from making any type of transaction with digital currency emitted by or in the name of the government of Venezuela as of 9 January 2018. The executive order referenced "Petro", a crypto-currency also known as petromoneda. He said the crypto-currency had been designed in February 2018 to "circumvent US sanctions" and access international financing.

After the detention of Guaidó's chief of staff, Roberto Marrero, in March 2019, the U.S. Treasury Department responded by placing sanctions on the Venezuelan bank BANDES and its subsidiaries. Univision said this action "put 'the entire banking sector' on notice" that "persons operating in Venezuela's financial sector may be subject to sanctions." China Development Bank has paid billions of dollars through BANDES to the Venezuelan government in exchange for crude oil; the sanctions will make it difficult for Venezuela to restructure its US$20 billion debt with China.

The Maduro administration issued a statement saying that it "energetically rejects the unilateral, coercive, arbitrary and illegal measures" that would affect banking for millions of people.

US National Security Advisor Bolton said that "Our aim is to bring this crisis to a conclusion quickly for the benefit of the Venezuelan people to get the Maduro regime to peacefully transition to the Guaido regime so that we can have free and fair elections." Treasury Secretary Mnuchin said, "The willingness of Maduro's inner-circle to exploit Venezuela’s institutions knows no bounds. Regime insiders have transformed BANDES and its subsidiaries into vehicles to move funds abroad in an attempt to prop up Maduro. Maduro and his enablers have distorted the original purpose of the bank, which was founded to help the economic and social well-being of the Venezuelan people, as part of a desperate attempt to hold onto power."

The U.S. Treasury added sanctions to the Central Bank of Venezuela on 17 April 2019. U.S. Treasury Secretary Mnuchin stated that, "While this designation will inhibit most Central Bank activities undertaken by the illegitimate Maduro regime, the United States has taken steps to ensure that regular debit and credit card transactions can proceed and personal remittances and humanitarian assistance continue unabated and are able to reach those suffering under the Maduro regime’s repression." The new sanctions  closed some loopholes that allowed for continued financing of the government. The Central Bank was able to obtain loans without seeking approval from the National Assembly. It also sold gold to the central banks of other countries. By interrupting the foreign exchange handled by the Central Bank, PDVSA purchases of production supplies were impacted.

The Venezuelan banking sanctions caused a rippled effect in that the New York Federal Reserve decided to restrict opening of new accounts in Puerto Rico's offshore banking industry, and planned tighter restrictions in that area.

CLAP 

On 25 July 2019, the United States Department of Treasury imposed sanctions on 10 people and 13 companies (from Colombia, Hong Kong (China), Mexico, Panama, Turkey, the United Arab Emirates and the U.S.) in a Venezuelan food subsidy called "CLAP", which includes stepsons of President Nicolas Maduro and a Colombian businessman Alex Saab. According to a statement by Treasury Secretary Steven Mnuchin, "The corruption network that operates the CLAP program has allowed Maduro and his family members to steal from the Venezuelan people. They use food as a form of social control, to reward political supporters and punish opponents, all the while pocketing hundreds of millions of dollars through a number of fraudulent schemes." The U.S. Attorney's Office for the Southern District of Florida charged Saab and another Colombian businessman with money laundering related to a 2011-15 scheme to pay bribes to take advantage of Venezuela's government-set exchange rate.

The Maduro government rejected the sanctions, calling it sign of "desperation" by "the gringo empire." President Maduro said "Imperialists, prepare for more defeats, because the CLAP in Venezuela will continue, no one takes the CLAP away from the people." A communique from the Venezuelan foreign ministry "denounces the repeated practice of economic terrorism by the US government against the Venezuelan people, announcing measures whose criminal purpose is to deprive all Venezuelans of their right to food."

Colombian businessman Alex Saab has sold food to Venezuela for more than USD 200 million in a negotiation signed by President Nicolás Maduro through a registered company in Hong Kong. On 23 August 2017, the Venezuelan attorney general, Luisa Ortega Díaz, named Alex Saab as the owner of the Mexican firm Group Grand Limited, 26 along with Colombian businessmen Álvaro Pulido and Rofolfo Reyes, "presumably President Nicolás Maduro" and dedicated to selling food to the CLAP. Saab would have met Álvaro Pulido in 2012, when he was dedicated to supplying the Saab company, but this activity would have stopped doing it in 2014.

On 19 April 2018, after a multilateral meeting between over a dozen European and Latin American countries, United States Department of the Treasury officials stated that they had collaborated with Colombian officials to investigate corrupt import programs of the Maduro administration including CLAP. They explained that Venezuelan officials pocketed 70% of the proceeds allocated for importation programs destined to alleviate hunger in Venezuela. Treasury officials said they sought to seize the proceeds that were being funneled into the accounts of corrupt Venezuelan officials and hold them for a possible future government in Venezuela.

An April 2019 communication from the United States Department of State highlighted the 2017 National Assembly investigation finding that the government paid US$42 for food that cost under US$13, and that "Maduro's inner circle kept the difference, which totaled more than $200 million dollars in at least one case", adding that food boxes were "distributed in exchange for votes".

On 17 September 2019, the United States Department of Treasury expanded further sanctions on 16 entities (from Colombia, Italy and Panama) and 3 individuals, accusing them of helping the Venezuelan government to "corruptly profit from imports of food aid and distribution in Venezuela".

Gasoline 
Since late 2019, the U.S. has prevented sending gasoline by Venezuela's fuel suppliers. while the own once-formidable refining industry of Venezuela cannot produce gasoline and country is facing a chronic shortage of gasoline. This action is part of Trump's "maximum pressure" campaign to overthrow  Maduro.

Canada 

Canada sanctioned 40 Venezuelan officials, including Maduro, in September 2017. The sanctions were for behaviors that undermined democracy after at least 125 people were killed in the 2017 protests and "in response to the government of Venezuela's deepening descent into dictatorship"; Chrystia Freeland, Foreign Minister said, "Canada will not stand by silently as the government of Venezuela robs its people of their fundamental democratic rights". Canadians were banned from transactions with the 40 individuals, whose Canadian assets were frozen. The Canadian government holds that Maduro played a "key role in the political and economic crisis", and its sanctions targeted "members of his cabinet and officials from Venezuela's military, Supreme Court and National Electoral Council". Freeland said the sanctions were intended to pressure Maduro to "restore constitutional order and respect the democratic rights of the Venezuelan people". She added that Canada had delayed in imposing sanctions because Canadian laws did not allow it to do so quickly.

The Canadian regulations of the Special Economic Measures Act prohibited any "person in Canada and any Canadian outside Canada from: dealing in property, wherever situated, that is owned, held or controlled by listed persons or a person acting on behalf of a listed person; entering into or facilitating any transaction related to a dealing prohibited by these Regulations; providing any financial or related services in respect of a dealing prohibited by these Regulations; making available any goods, wherever situated, to a listed person or a person acting on behalf of a listed person; and providing any financial or other related services to or for the benefit of a listed person." A number of exceptions to the noted prohibitions were added.

November 2017 additions 
In addition to the 40 individuals sanctioned under the Special Economic Measures Act in September, on 23 November 2017, Canada added sanctions under the Justice for Victims of Corrupt Foreign Officials Act. "These individuals are responsible for, or complicit in, gross violations of internationally recognized human rights, have committed acts of significant corruption, or both." Three of the 19 individuals added to the Canadian list had already been sanctioned in September (Maduro, Tareck El Aissami and Gustavo González López), bringing to 56 the total number of individuals sanctioned by Canada as of 2017.

May 2018 additions 
Responding to the 20 May 2018 presidential elections, Canada sanctioned 14 more Venezuelans. Canada's Special Economic Measures (Venezuela) Regulations were amended on 30 May 2018 because, since the first sanctions were imposed, the "economic, political and humanitarian crisis in Venezuela has continued to worsen as it moves ever closer to full dictatorship." The government said the 2018 presidential election was "illegitimate and anti-democratic," and sanctioned Maduro's wife, Cilia Flores, along with 13 other members of the ANC and TSJ.

April 2019 additions 
On 15 April 2019, Canada announced that another round of sanctions on 43 individuals were applied on 12 April based on the Special Economic Measures Act. The government statement said those sanctioned are "high ranking officials of the Maduro regime, regional governors and/or directly implicated in activities undermining democratic institutions", and that:These measures are being taken in response to the Maduro regime’s anti-democratic actions, particularly relating to the repression and persecution of the members of the interim government, censorship, and excessive use of force against civil society, undermining the independence of the judiciary and other democratic institutions. Foreign Minister Freeland stated, "The Maduro dictatorship must be held accountable for this crisis and depriving Venezuelans of their most basic rights and needs. Canada is committed to supporting the peaceful restoration of constitutional democracy in Venezuela."

The newly sanctioned Venezuelans included Jorge Arreaza, Maduro's Minister of Foreign Affairs. In response, the Venezuelan Foreign Ministry has accused Canada of supporting Trump's "war adventure" and said that Prime Minister Justin Trudeau "has invalidated Canada as a reliable actor in dialogue."

European Union 

In 2017, the European Union had approved an embargo on arms and material, adding Venezuela along with North Korea and Syria, to countries where European companies cannot sell material that may be used for repression. in 2018, those sanctions were continued for another year because of "human rights violations and undermining of democracy and the rule of law under President Nicolás Maduro".

The European Union sanctioned seven Venezuela officials on 18 January 2018, singling them out as being responsible for deteriorating democracy in the country: Diosdado Cabello, Néstor Reverol (Interior Minister), Gustavo González López (Head of Intelligence), Antonio Benavides Torres (National Guard Commander), Tibisay Lucena (Head of Electoral Council), Maikel Moreno (Supreme Court President), and Tarek William Saab (Attorney General). The sanctioned individuals were prohibited from entering the nations of the European Union, and their assets were frozen. Cabello, known as number two in Chavismo, had not been sanctioned by the U.S. when the European Union sancioned him.

The Venezuelan government appealed the sanctions in the European General Court in February 2018 that included the arms embargo and material that could be used for internal repression. The EGC dismissed the appeal on 20 September 2019.

On 25 June 2018, the EU sanctioned another eleven officials in response to the May 2018 Venezuelan presidential election, which the E.U. described as "neither free nor fair", stating that "their outcome lacked any credibility as the electoral process did not ensure the necessary guarantees for them to be inclusive and democratic". The additional sanctions bring the total to eighteen Venezuelans under a travel ban and asset freeze in European nations. The sanctioned individuals included Tareck El Aissami (Vice President of Economy and Minister for Industry and Production, formerly SEBIN); Freddy Bernal (Head of Local Committees for Supply and Production and SEBIN commissioner); Elías Jaua (Minister of Education and former head of Presidential Commission for the ANC); and Delcy Rodríguez (Vice President).

Voice of America reported in April 2019 tension between the US and the EU over increasing sanctions; EU nations are reluctant to apply sanctions to a nation, despite evidence that Russia's aid is propping up Maduro, but are still considering tougher sanctions on individuals in his government. Spain was still receiving Venezuelan oil in repayment for debt as of 10 April 2019 and many Spanish companies still operate in Venezuela.

In June 2019, the Associated Press reported that five EU member states (United Kingdom, France, Germany, Spain and the Netherlands) were considering imposing sanctions on President Nicolás Maduro and several top officials for their recent crackdown on political opponents following the April 30 uprising. However, EU member states are divided over the timing of any action for fear of derailing a negotiated exit to the country's crisis.

Entry bans

Lima Group 
After Nicolás Maduro's second inauguration, on 7 January 2019, the Lima Group, except for Mexico, announced that they would follow Peru's decision and ban the entry of people linked with Maduro's administration. The Lima Group is made up of Argentina (until 24 March 2021), Brazil, Canada, Chile, Colombia, Costa Rica, Guatemala, Guyana, Honduras, Mexico, Panama, Paraguay, Peru and Saint Lucia.

Colombia 
Colombia has not directly sanctioned Venezuelans, rather has banned figures close to Maduro from entering the country. Christian Krüger Sarmiento, director of Colombia Migration, announced on 30 January 2019 that the Colombian government maintained a list of people banned from entering Colombia or subject to expulsion. As of January 2019, the list had 200 people with a "close relationship and support for the Nicolás Maduro regime", but Krüger said the initial list could increase or decrease. Krüger said, "We are not going to allow this kind of collaborators of a dictatorship to come to stay in our country and to hide in our country." The list—which would not be disclosed in its entirely—is headed by Maduro, his wife Flores, Cabello, and Delcy Rodríguez and encompasses Venezuela's military leadership. The decision to ban collaborators of the Maduro administration from entering Colombia came after the Lima Group disavowed Maduro as the legitimate president of Venezuela. Maduro's cousin, Argimiro Maduro Morán, and family were turned back when they sought refuge in Colombia during the 2019 Venezuelan blackouts. In March, Édgar Alejandro Lugo Pereira—an active military person who works for Venezuela's Foreign Ministry—was detained and expelled; he was carrying US$14,000 and 20 passports.

Other 

As of 27 March 2018, the Washington Office on Latin America said 78 Venezuelans associated with Maduro had been sanctioned by different countries.

Panama 
On 27 March 2018, Panama sanctioned 55 public officials and 16 businesses that operate in Panama, related to the family of Maduro's wife, Cilia Flores. Panama thus become the first country in Latin America to sanction the Maduro administration, joining the US, Canada, the European Union and Switzerland. The sanctioned businesses have members of the Malpica-Flores family on their boards of directors.

The sanctions imposed by Panama triggered a diplomatic crisis between the two countries, which ended on 26 April 2018, when Maduro announced that he had called Panamanian President Juan Carlos Varela and they had agreed to restore diplomatic relations.

Switzerland 
Switzerland implemented sanctions against Venezuela on 28 March 2018, freezing the assets of seven ministers and high officials due to human rights violations and deteriorating rule of law and democracy. The sanctions mimicked those of the European Union. Switzerland was "seriously concerned by the repeated violations of individual freedoms in Venezuela, where the principle of separation of powers is severely undermined and the process in view of the forthcoming elections suffers from a serious lack of legitimacy".

On 10 July 2018, Switzerland imposed sanctions against the eleven Venezuelans that were sanctioned by the European Union in June 2018.

Mexico 
The Mexican Senate froze the assets of officials of the Maduro administration and prohibited them from entering Mexico on 20 April 2018; the officials sanctioned were: Antonio Benavides Torres, Delcy Rodríguez, Diosdado Cabello, Maikel Moreno, Néstor Reverol, Tarek William Saab, and Tibisay Lucena.

On 18 July 2019, the Mexican Ministry of Finance froze bank accounts of 19 companies related to the sale of low quality and over-priced food to the Venezuelan government's CLAP program. Moreover, the ministry has opened an investigation relating to money laundering after detecting "irregularities for more than 150 million dollars."

Curaçao 
On 21 June 2019, Curaçao announced a gold import and transit ban on Venezuela that was made effective immediately after its announcement. In the word of its prime minister Eugene Rhuggenaath: "Criminal investigations that have been conducted on the ABC islands give an indication that the trade in and transport of Venezuelan gold and the resulting cash flows can be accompanied by (drug or other) smuggling, forgery and money laundering. This entails integrity and security risks that cause great concern both locally and internationally".

United Kingdom 
After Brexit, the United Kingdom has continued to issue sanctions aligned with the EU. In July 2021 the UK issued a series of sanctions that included Colombian businessman Alex Saab, which included the freezing of assets and travel bans. Álvaro Enrique Pulido, also pointed out as his associate, was also sanctioned, in both cases for ""exploiting two of Venezuela's public programs that were established to provide poor Venezuelans with affordable food and housing", saying that "They both benefited from improperly awarded contracts, in which promised goods were delivered at highly inflated prices. Their actions caused more suffering to Venezuelans who were already in poverty for their own private enrichment."

Evasion 
Some ships' captains and owners sympathetic to Venezuela are "going dark", turning off their transponders locations, to avoid the U.S. sanctions and deliver oil to Russia, China, and India. Turning off the transponders creates an environmental risk of ship collisions.

In January 2020, despite the entry ban imposed by the European Union, Vice President Delcy Rodríguez met in the guest area of the Madrid–Barajas Airport with Spain's minister José Luis Ábalos from the Spanish Socialist Workers' Party.

Minister of Industries and National Production Tareck El Aissami announced in October 2018 in response to US sanctions that all foreign exchange government auctions will no longer be quoted in US dollars and would use euros, Chinese yuan and other hard currencies instead. El Aissami said the government would open bank accounts in Europe and Asia as potential workarounds to financial sanctions. In addition, Venezuela's banking sector will now be able to participate in currency auctions three times a week, adding that the government would sell some 2 billion euros amid a rebound in oil prices.

As of 2020, Mexico defied the United States sanctions by allowing fuel shipments to Nicolás Maduro.

In May 2020, despite the sanctions on both Iran and Venezuela, Iran sent five oil tankers to Venezuela during fuel shortages in the country.

Responses 
After the sanctions were issued, Venezuela has continued to ship oil and send money to ally countries. In April 2022, Venezuela sent a shipment of 200,000 fuel oil barrels and 190,000 diesel barrels to Cuba, for the Matanzas storage terminal. The same month, Venezuela paid Saint Vincent and the Grenadines' debt with Petrocaribe, estimated to have been around $189 million dollars.

Public Opinion
A poll conducted among Venezuelans found that 68% believed that the sanctions had a negative impact on their quality of life.

Analyses and reports 

While the Venezuelan government has stated that the United States is responsible for its economic collapse, economists agree that shortages and high inflation in Venezuela began before US sanctions were directed towards the country. 

The Wall Street Journal says that economists place the blame for Venezuela's economy shrinking by half on "Maduro's policies, including widespread nationalizations, out-of-control spending that sparked inflation, price controls that led to shortages, and widespread graft and mismanagement." Reuters has stated that the collapse of global oil prices in 2020, alongside the sanctions, have contributed to fuel shortages in the country. The Washington Post stated that "the deprivation long predates recently imposed US sanctions".

In 2018, during the 167th session of the Inter-American Commission of Human Rights, nutrition expert Susana Raffalli, advisor to PROVEA and Caritas Organization of Venezuela, stated that nutrition was arguably the best indicator that showed how the crisis preceded the sanctions, explaining that 36% of children in the country suffered from stunted growth, which was a symptom of problems that dated at least seven years, 2011 by then. She also cited the PDVAL affair as an example of food shortages before sanctions, when tons of food supplies were imported and later decomposed in 2010. Raffali further criticized the "millionaire" expending in the electoral campaign for the presidential elections that were taking place that year, which suggested that spending to solve the crisis was not a priority for the ruling party.

In January 2019, David Smolansky, Organization of American States Commissioner for Venezuelan Migrants and Refugees, told Public Radio International that the sanctions prior to 2019 targeted Maduro and Chavismo "elites" while having little impact on average Venezuelans. 

In a February 2019 United Nations press conference surrounded by diplomats from 16 other countries, including Russia, China, Iran, North Korea, and Cuba, Venezuelan Foreign Minister Jorge Arreaza said that economic sanctions have "blocked" the Venezuelan economy, costing it US$30 billion. Reporting on Arreaza's statements, the Associated Press said that Maduro was blocking aid, and "saying that Venezuelans are not beggars and that the move is part of a U.S.-led coup".

In March 2019, the United Nations High Commissioner for Human Rights (OHCHR) documented that "information gathered indicates that the socioeconomic crisis had been unfolding for several years prior to the imposition of these sanctions". Michelle Bachelet, High Commissioner for OHCHR, updated the situation in a March 2019 oral report following the visit of a five-person delegation to Venezuela, saying that the government had not acknowledged or addressed the dramatically deteriorating conditions, and she was concerned that although the "pervasive and devastating economic and social crisis began before the imposition of the first economic sanctions", the sanctions could worsen the situation.

An April 2019 report from two "prominent, left-leaning US economists", Mark Weisbrot and Jeffrey Sachs, claimed that a 31% rise in the number of deaths between 2017 and 2018 was due to the 2017 sanctions, and that 40,000 people in Venezuela may have died as a result. The report stated: "The sanctions are depriving Venezuelans of lifesaving medicines, medical equipment, food, and other essential imports." Weisbrot stated that he "could not prove those excess deaths were the result of sanctions, but said the increase ran parallel to the imposition of the measures and an attendant fall in oil production". They estimated that there were "more than 300,000 people who are estimated to be at risk because of lack of access to medicines or treatment because of sanctions on the country. That includes 16,000 people who need dialysis, 16,000 cancer patients and roughly 80,000 people with HIV" 

The report's findings and methodology were described as invalid by the Brookings Institution. They stated that "the bulk of the deterioration in living standards occurred long before the sanctions were enacted in 2017." In May 2019, Harvard economist Ricardo Hausmann (appointed by Guaidó as Venezuela's representative to the Inter-American Development Bank) and Harvard Kennedy School of Government research fellow Frank Muci published a rebuttal to the report in Americas Quarterly, noting that to make their point, Weisbrot and Sachs take Colombia as a counterfactual for Venezuela, and arguing that Colombia is not a good counterfactual. In their rebuttal, they explain that the oil production trends between both countries were very different in the decade before sanctions and that two countries are also radically different in other dimensions. The rebuttal also states that just a month after the financial sanctions in late 2017, Nicolás Maduro fired both the relatively technocratic PDVSA president and oil minister and replaced them with a single military general with no experience in oil, who in turn fired and imprisoned over 60 senior managers of the oil company, including its previous president, on corruption charges, while nothing remotely similar happened in Colombia, thus confounding the effects of the sanctions with those of the firing. Journalist Fernando Núñez-Noda described the assertion as false; he points out that even the report admits we will never know "what the counterfactual data would have been" (i.e. what would have happened without the sanctions), and shows that the report minimizes the responsibility of Maduro's government in the deaths).

A US State Department spokesperson commented that, "as the writers themselves concede, the report is based on speculation and conjecture". The spokesperson added: "The economic situation in Venezuela has been deteriorating for decades, as Venezuelans themselves will confirm, thanks to Maduro's ineptitude and economic mismanagement." Hausmann asserts that the analysis is flawed because it makes invalid assumptions about Venezuela based on a different country, Colombia, saying that "taking what happened in Colombia since 2017 as a counterfactual for what would have happened in Venezuela if there had been no financial sanctions makes no sense". Calling it "sloppy reasoning", the authors also state that the analysis failed to rule out other explanations, and failed to correctly account for PDVSA finances.

In April 2019, Human Rights Watch (HRW) and Johns Hopkins Bloomberg School of Public Health jointly published a report entitled "Venezuela's humanitarian emergency: Large-scale UN response needed to address health and food crises". The HRW/Johns Hopkins report noted that most sanctions are "limited to canceling visas and freezing assets of key officials implicated in abuses and corruption. They in no way target the Venezuelan economy." The report also stated that the 2017 ban on dealing in Venezuelan government stocks and bonds allows exceptions for food and medicine, and that the 28 January 2019 PDVSA sanctions could worsen the situation, although "the crisis precedes them".

In an interview in late May 2019, Guaidó said that the sanctions had weakened a network of Cuban spies that was allegedly operating in Venezuela.

Hours after the United States imposed sanctions on Luis Parra and seven other National Assembly deputies in relation to 2020 Venezuelan National Assembly Delegated Committee election, Maduro's Foreign Minister Jorge Arreaza published a statement saying that the sanctions imposed by the US Treasury seek to "interfere and undermine the proper functioning of democratic institutions, with the unusual intention to designate from Washington the authorities of the legislative power." The statement also argues that these tactics are "contrary to international law and undermine the stability, peace and self-determination of the Venezuelan people."

An October 2020 report published by the Washington Office on Latin America (WOLA)  by Venezuelan economist Luis Oliveros found that "while Venezuela’s economic crisis began before the first U.S. sectoral sanctions were imposed in 2017, these measures 'directly contributed to its deep decline, and to the further deterioration of the quality of life of Venezuelans' ". The report concluded that economic sanctions "have cost Venezuela’s government as much as $31 billion since 2017"

In late 2020, Transparencia Venezuela published a report analyzing the impact of international sanctions on Venezuela, describing the economic and political context before their application, the reasons provided and offering different interpretations of their political, social and economic effects, and thus the Venezuelan life quality as well. The report concludes that a documental analysis left clear that economic sanctions had affected public finance in Venezuela, limiting income sources and public spending, as well as restricting Petróleos de Venezuela, all of which in turn has caused harm in the country's economic activity. However, the report continues concluding that this did not mean that said sanctions were responsible for the "institutional, political, economic, social and environmental crisis that has characterized Venezuela for more than a decade"; on the contrary, it points out that the evolution of indicators in these fields before the sanctions revealed the development of a crisis caused by the "kleptocratic, inefficient and authoritarian" Venezuelan administration.

Consultancy firm ANOVA Policy Research published on 20 January 2021 a report on the impact of international sanctions against Venezuela between 2017 and 2019. The report concluded that the sanctions were linked to a decrease in monthly oil production, an increase in monthly food importation and an increase in monthly medicine importation, detailing that despite a partial responsibility of the decline of oil production, there was no evidence of negative effects on the importation of food and medicines. The analysis also reported there was no causal relationship between economic sanctions and an actual increase in the importation of food and medicines. Moreover, the economic data was likely skewed due to the liberalization of the Venezuelan economy in late 2017, when price controls were abandoned for imported products.

Alena Douhan, United Nations special rapporteur on the negative impact of unilateral coercive measures, visited Venezuela from 30 January to 12 February 2021 to investigate the impact of international sanctions. Before her visit, 66 Venezuelan NGOs (including PROVEA) asked Douhan in an open letter to consider the harmful impact of sanctions in the context of years of repression, corruption and economic mismanagement that predate the sanctions, and requested she meet independent press and civil society researchers. She was welcomed on arrival by a government minister and the Venezuelan ambassador to the UN. In her preliminary report, Douhan said that the economic pressure imposed by the US, the EU and other countries worsened the economic and humanitarian situation in Venezuela, but that Venezuela's economic decline "began in 2014 with the fall in oil prices" and that "mismanagement and corruption had also contributed." Douhan also asked the US, UK and Portugal to release an estimated $6 billion in frozen Venezuelan foreign assets. The government welcomed the report, while the opposition accused her of "playing into the hands of the regime" of Nicolás Maduro. Douhan was criticized by the Venezuelan civil society, and several non-governmental organizations pronounced themselves in social media with the hashtag "#Lacrisisfueprimero" (The crisis came first).

Persons sanctioned 
Legend: 

 Person currently sanctioned   Person no longer sanctioned

Entities sanctioned 
Legend:

See also 
 Cartel of the Suns
 International sanctions during the Russo-Ukrainian War
 International sanctions during the 2022 Russian invasion of Ukraine
 International sanctions against Iran
 International sanctions during apartheid
 United States embargoes

Notes

References

External links 
 
 
 
"Sanciones internacionales: ¿Origen o fin de la crisis?", Transparencia Venezuela
"Impacto de las Sanciones Financieras Internacionales contra Venezuela: Nueva Evidencia", ANOVA

2010s in politics
Crisis in Venezuela
Foreign relations of Venezuela
International reactions to the crisis in Venezuela
Venezuela
Political history of Venezuela
Venezuelan presidential crisis
Venezuela–European Union relations